A rangefinder (also rangefinding telemeter, depending on the context) is a device used to measure distances to remote objects. Originally optical devices used in surveying, they soon found applications in other fields, such as photography and in the military. They were specially useful for finding the range of a target, such as in naval gunnery and anti-aircraft artillery. The word telemeter is derived .

Designs

The first rangefinder telemeter was invented by James Watt in 1769 and put to use in 1771 in surveying canals.  Watt called his instrument a micrometer, a term now used with a different meaning in engineering (the micrometer screw gauge).  It consisted of two parallel hairs in the focal plane of a telescope eyepiece crossing an upright hair.  At the point to be measured, two sliding targets on a surveyor's rod were adjusted to align with the hairs in the telescope.  The distance to the rod could then be determined from the distance between the targets on the rod by trigonometry.

Several others have been credited with the invention of the rangefinder telemeter at one time or another. The Royal Society of Arts gave an award to W. Green for its invention in 1778, even though they were made aware of Watt's priority.

In 1778, Georg Friedrich Brander invented the coincidence rangefinder. Two mirrors set a distance apart horizontally in a long slim box, similar to a subtense bar but located at the measuring station, and forming two images. This rangefinder does not require a measuring rod at the target and could perhaps be considered the first true telemeter. In 1790 Jesse Ramsden invented a half-image range finder. Though Alexander Selligue is often mistakenly credited with the invention, he did invent an improved telemeter with fixed lenses in 1821 and is responsible for coining the term.

In 1881, the British Royal Artillery adopted the depression range finder, which had been developed by Captain H.S.S. Watkin for use by coastal artillery. It used the measurement of the angle of depression from the observer, sited on a high vantage point, to the waterline of the target vessel.  

In 1899, Carl Pulfrich at Carl Zeiss AG fabricated a practical stereoscopic rangefinder, based on a patent of Hector Alexander de Grousilliers.

World War II era telemeters worked optically with two telescopes focused on the same target but a distance apart along a baseline. The range to the target is found by measuring the difference in bearing of the two telescopes and solving the skinny triangle. Solutions can be obtained automatically, using tables or, rarely, manual calculation. The greater the distance to the target, the longer the baseline needs to be for accurate measurement. The baseline required for the telemeters for battleship guns is very large. More modern telemeters use an electronic technology such as lasers or radar.

Applications
Applications include surveying, navigation, to assist focusing in photography, choosing a golf club according to distance, and correcting aim of a projectile weapon for distance.

Golf
Laser rangefinders are used in golf to measure the yardage of a particular shot but also to gauge slope and wind as well. There has been debate over whether they should be allowed in tournaments. While their use is banned on the professional level, they are becoming widely used on the amateur level.

Ballistics
Rangefinders may be used by users of firearms over long distances, to measure the distance to a target to allow for projectile drop. Until the development of electronic means of measuring range during the Second World War, warships used very large optical rangefinders—with a baseline of many meters—to measure range for naval gunnery.

Forestry
Rangefinders are used for surveying in forestry. Special devices with anti-leaf filters are used.

Virtual reality
Since the 1990s, rangefinders have been used in virtual reality systems to detect operator movements and locate objects.

See also
 GfK-Telemeter, a device to determine the viewing rate
 Telemeter chronograph

References

Further reading
 "Range Finder (instrument)." Encyclopædia Britannica Online. Encyclopædia Britannica, 
 Army Test and Evaluation Command, Aberdeen Proving Ground Maryland (1969)  Laser Rangefinders Ft. Belvoir Defense Technical Information Center, U.S. Army, Ft. Belvoir, Virginia,  (early history of the use of lasers in rangefinders)
 Photographic and Imaging Manufacturers Association (1999) American national standard for photography (optics) : rangefinders and other focusing aids – performance specifications (revision and redesignation of "ANSI PH3.619-1988" as "ANSI/PIMA IT3.619-1998") American National Standards Institute, New York, 
 Hicks, Roger and Schultz, Frances (2003) Rangefinder: Equipment, History, Techniques Guild of Master Craftsman, Lewes, UK, 

 Whitehouse, J. C. (2005) "Further considerations of defocus rangefinders" Transactions of the Institute of Measurement and Control 27(4): pp. 297–316
 Range-Finding in the Army. How to use range-finders to get results: the erect and inverted types, Popular Science monthly, February 1919, page 118–120, Scanned by Google Books

External links

 Rangefinder Comparison - A National Forest Service document

Length, distance, or range measuring devices